Alejandro González and Eduardo Struvay were the defending champions.
Struvay chose to not participate and González teamed up with Eduardo Struvay, but they lost to Alejandro Fabbri and Guido Pella in the first round.
Ricardo Hocevar and André Miele defeated Santiago González and Horacio Zeballos in the final.

Seeds
1st-seeded pair received a bye in the first round.

Draw

Draw

References
 Doubles Draw

Manta Open - Trofeo Ricardo Delgado Aray - Doubles
Manta Open